Zita Jesus-Leito (born ) is a Curaçaoan politician. From 2017 to 2021, she was the minister for public transportation and infrastructure. She is currently a member of the Parliament of Curaçao.

Early life 
Zita Jesus-Leito was born in either 1956 or 1957.

Career 
She was a member of the Parliament of the Netherlands Antilles for a few months in 2006; a commissioner for Curaçao three times between 2004 and 2010; and a member of the Parliament of Curaçao. In 2014, she was named the fifth leader of the Real Alternative Party. In 2017, she was appointed as a minister to Eugene Rhuggenaath's government.

In November 2020, after the completion of wheelchair-accessible infrastructure at Grote Knip Beach, members of the opposition party (Movement for the Future of Curaçao) called for her to resign, because the construction impeded normal access to the beach. As the minister for planning and transportation, she had advocated for and celebrated the infrastructure project; she admitted that it was an unlicensed project. Five months later, her party requested that she not return to parliament after her ministry ended, saying they wished for younger politicians to enter parliament. Jesus-Leito was 64 and denied the request.

Her other ministerial duties included working with World Meteorological Organization hurricane commissars in their meetings.

References

Citations

Bibliography

 
 
 
 
 

Living people
Members of the Estates of Curaçao
Party for the Restructured Antilles politicians
Government ministers of Curaçao
Transport ministers of Curaçao
Women government ministers of Curaçao
Year of birth missing (living people)